Mien is an ethnonym for the Yao people of China or the Dao people of Vietnam.

Mien may also refer to:

Places
Mień, Poland
Mien (lake), in southern Sweden
 7706 Mien, a main-belt asteroid
Mien crater, a meteorite crater in southern Sweden

People

Groups of people
Iu Mien Americans, primarily Indochinese refugees who may have been born in or have become naturalized citizens of the U.S.

Individuals with the name
Mien Duchateau (1904–1999), Dutch runner
Mien Marchant (1866-1952), Dutch artist
Mien Ruys (1904–1999), Dutch landscape and garden architect
Mien Schopman-Klaver (1911–2018), Dutch athlete
Mien Suhadi, an Indonesian tennis player
Mien Sugandhi (1934–2020), Indonesian politician
Mien van Bree (1915–1983), Dutch cyclist
Mien van Itallie-Van Embden (1870–1959), Dutch lawyer and politician
Mien van Wulfften Palthe (1875–1960), Dutch feminist and pacifist
Đào Thị Miện (born 1981), a Vietnamese footballer
Wang Mien (1287–1359), Chinese painter
Vũ Miên (1718–1782), Vietnamese royal historian

Other uses
Hmong–Mien languages, of Southeast Asia
Mien, a restaurant at Harrah's Philadelphia

See also
Mein (disambiguation)